Gitoformate (INN, or pentaformylgitoxin, trade name Dynocard) is a cardiac glycoside, a type of drug that can be used in the treatment of congestive heart failure and cardiac arrhythmia (irregular heartbeat). Produced by Madaus, it is not available in the US, and does not seem to be available in Europe either.

Chemistry

Gitoformate is a derivative of the glycoside gitoxin, with five of the six free hydroxyl groups formylated, one on the aglycon and four on the sugar. Gitoxin, a cardiac glycoside from the woolly foxglove (Digitalis lanata), has an aglycon of the cardenolide type named gitoxigenin, which is also the aglycon of lanatoside B, another Digitalis lanata glycoside.

References 

Cardenolides
Formate esters
Tertiary alcohols